Daiva Balam is a 1959 Telugu-language swashbuckler film, produced and directed by Ponnaluru Vasanthakumar Reddy. It stars N. T. Rama Rao and Jayasri, with music composed by Ashwatthama. The film is the debut of Shobhan Babu in the film industry. The film is known to be one of the earliest Telugu film containing sequences in Eastmancolor.

Plot 
Once upon a time, there was a kingdom called Malava. King Ugrasena (Gummadi) has a daughter, Rupa. According to the astrologer's prediction, Rupa marries an ordinary citizen. Ugrasena becomes furious and wants to change this fate so he finds the whereabouts of the boy (Chandrasena), through astrologers, and orders him eliminated. But the boy escapes and grows up at an ashram along with his mother Annapurna (Malathi). Years roll by, and, once, while hunting, Rupa (Jayasri) gets acquainted with Chandrasena (N. T. Rama Rao) and they fall in love.

King Ugrasena announces a sports competition in the capital in which Chandrasena prevails and the king honors him. That night, Chandrasena secretly enters the fort, meets Rupa, and is captured by soldiers. At that moment, Annapurna pleads with the king to leave her son, but in vain Ugrasena recognizes him as the same and commands him to throw him into the cellar of demons. But Chandrasena kills the demon, reaches Rupa, and while escaping they drop into a dead house. Hence, the king announces whoever brings his daughter will be largess with a huge amount for which two guys, Takku (Relangi) and Tikku (Ramana Reddy) move. In the death house, Rupa is caught by an enchanter (Shobhan Babu) and takes her to their Queen Gandharva Rani (Mohana), and entrusts a challenge of getting a musical tree to Chandrasena from Chambala Island, ruled by wizard Kanakaksha (Mukkamala) in exchange of Rupa. 
After setting off on an adventurous journey, Chandrasena reaches the island where Kanakaksha's daughter Champa (Girija) falls for him, trapping her, he succeeds in achieving the musical tree and relieves Rupa. But unfortunately, Kanakaksha takes Chandrasena back by transforming him into a garland. Helpless, Rupa was seized by Takku-Tikku. Parallelly, on the island, Kanakaksha demands Chandrasena to marry his daughter, but he refuses, so, he keeps him in the prison and tortures him.

Fortunately, Rupa escapes from Takku-Tikku and gets back to the death house, reaches Chamba Island with the help of the musical tree, and lets Chandrasena free. Chandrasena eliminates Kanakaksha, blasts the island and both of them return Malava kingdom when Ugrasena also realizes no one can change the fortune. Finally, the movie ends on a happy note with the marriage of Chandrasena and Rupa.

Cast 
N. T. Rama Rao as Chandrasenudu
Jayasri as Rupa
Shobhan Babu as Enchanter
Gummadi as Ugrasena
Relangi as Takku
Ramana Reddy as Tikku
Mukkamala as Kanakasha
Vangara as astrologer Jaganatha Pandit
Kasturi Siva Rao as Madhava
Girija as Champa
Malathi as Annapurna
Mohana as Gandharva Rani

Soundtrack 

Music composed by Ashwatthama.

References 

1950s Telugu-language films